This is a list of all cricketers who have captained the Oman in an official international match. This includes One Day Internationals, Twenty20 Internationals and ICC Trophy games. The table is correct as of their last ODI game which was played on February 6, 2020.

One Day International

Oman played their first ODI on April 27, 2019.

Twenty20 International

Oman played their first T20 on July 15, 2017.

References

External links
Cricinfo

Oman